This is a list of Swedish television related events from 2007.

Events
30 March - Wrestler Martin Lidberg and his partner Cecilia Ehrling win the second season of Let's Dance.
1 June - Ventriloquist Zillah & Totte win the first season of Talang.
7 August - Major parts of southern Sweden is affected by a two hours-long television outage after 18.00 PM during the Tuesday afternoon. At 20.10 PM, the picture is back.
15 October - The shutdown of analog television in Sweden is completed.
7 December - Marie Picasso wins the fourth season of Idol.

Debuts

13 April - Talang (2006-2011, 2014–present)

Television shows

2000s
Idol (2004-2011, 2013–present)
Let's Dance (2006–present)
1–24 December - En riktig jul

Ending this year

Births

Deaths

See also
List of Swedish television ratings for 2007
2007 in Sweden

References